The Richmond Formation is a geologic formation in Michigan and Ohio. It preserves fossils dating back to the Ordovician period.

See also

 List of fossiliferous stratigraphic units in Michigan

References
 

Ordovician Indiana
Ordovician Michigan
Ordovician Ohio
Ordovician geology of Tennessee
Ordovician southern paleotropical deposits